The Marcus Corporation is an American publicly held company headquartered in Milwaukee, Wisconsin. The company operates two principal divisions: Marcus Theatres and Marcus Hotels and Resorts.

History 
Marcus Corporation was founded on November 1, 1935 by Ben Marcus with the purchase of a single movie theatre screen in Ripon, Wisconsin. This movie theatre remains with Marcus as a first run theater, the Campus Cinema (near Ripon College), with titles appealing to both adults and families. It was also a restaurant franchisee, operating the Marc's Big Boy affiliate of the Big Boy Restaurants chain and serving as the Milwaukee area franchise for Kentucky Fried Chicken. Marcus sold the KFC franchises by 1992 and closed the last Marc's in 1995.

One of the company's principal assets, Baymont Inn & Suites, was sold to La Quinta Corporation in 2003. Marcus Cable, which merged in 1998 with Charter Communications, was founded by a member of the Marcus family, but held no direct corporate connection to Marcus Corporation itself.

Marcus Theatres

Marcus Theatres is a United States movie theater chain that owns and/or manages screens in Wisconsin, Illinois, Iowa, Minnesota, Missouri, Nebraska, North Dakota, and Ohio. In 2000, the chain partnered with MovieTickets.com for advanced ticketing capabilities. This partnership was extended in 2011.

In 2008, Marcus acquired seven theater locations in Nebraska from Douglas Theatre Company.

In August 2013, Rolando B. Rodriguez was appointed as president and chief executive officer of Marcus Theatres. After Rodriguez took over, the company introduced two new initiatives in October 2013: $5 admission for any movie on Tuesdays at select theaters and an alternative programming block known as "Theatre Entertainment Network. In January 2014, Marcus launched an initiative called "Indie Focus" that offers art and independent films in select locations. The chain began a partnership with Fandango in fall 2015, making Fandango its preferred ticketing partner.

In December 2016, the chain completed its acquisition of 14 theaters owned by Wehrenberg Theatres in four states.

In November 2018, Marcus Theaters, a division of Marcus Corp acquired Movie Tavern to expand into Arkansas, Colorado, Georgia, Kentucky, Louisiana, New York, Pennsylvania, Texas, and Virginia. The acquisition was valued at $126 million sold in a combination of cash and stock, (NYSE: MCS). This adds 22 locations and 208 screens to the company's now total 1,098 screens at 90 locations in 17 states, representing a 23% increase in Marcus Theatres' total screen count. The first Movie Tavern location opened in 2001 in Fort Worth, Texas, and sold to Southern Theatres in 2013. Movie Tavern has become one of the largest and fastest-growing in-theatre dining concepts in the United States thanks to their praised menu and unique offerings.

Marcus closed all Marcus Cinemas and Movie Tavern theaters after 8:30 p.m. showtimes on March 17, 2020 indefinitely, due to the impact of the COVID-19 pandemic on cinema and following the closures of competitors. Marcus Theaters chairman, president and CEO Rolando Rodriguez pledged full cooperation with the Center for Disease Control (CDC). The chain began a slow-process reopening in late June 2020 with several theaters, before a wider reopening started rolling out on August 21, 2020 to take advantage of the wide release for Tenet. With that film underperforming and new product being held back as another case surge in Wisconsin happened, Marcus began to re-close some theaters and reduce others to weekend and Tuesday operations only by the start of October. It also later pushed the redemption period for refills of its annual low-cost 'unlimited refills' 2020 reusable popcorn bucket for the entirety of 2021.

Marcus Hotels and Resorts
Marcus Hotels and Resorts, currently owns or manages 17 hotels and resorts in  California, Illinois, Minnesota, Nebraska, Nevada, Oklahoma, Texas, and Wisconsin, as well as one vacation club in Wisconsin.

See also 
 Hilton Milwaukee City Center

References

External links
 Official website
 

Companies based in Milwaukee
Movie theatre chains in the United States
Economy of the Midwestern United States
Economy of the Southwestern United States
Companies listed on the New York Stock Exchange
Entertainment companies established in 1935
1935 establishments in Wisconsin
Hospitality companies established in 1935